is a passenger railway station located in Tarumi-ku, Kobe, Hyōgo Prefecture, Japan, operated by the private Sanyo Electric Railway.

Lines

Station layout
The station consists of two unnumbered side platforms connected by an underground passage. There is no station building, and the station is unattended.

Platforms

Adjacent stations

|-
!colspan=5|Sanyo Electric Railway

History
It was renamed  on August 1, 1935, and renamed to its present name in 1937

Passenger statistics
In fiscal 2018, the station was used by an average of 1044 passengers daily (boarding passengers only).

Surrounding area
 Otoshiyama Archaeological Park
 Kitsunezuka Kofun
 Maiko Hosomichi Park

See also
List of railway stations in Japan

References

External links

 Official website (Sanyo Electric Railway) 

Railway stations in Japan opened in 1917
Railway stations in Kobe